Sir Matthew Crooks Cameron,  (2 October 1822 – 25 June 1887) was a politician in Ontario, Canada. He was a Conservative member of the Legislative Assembly of Ontario from 1867 to 1878. He represented the riding of Toronto East. He served in the cabinet of the first Premier, John Sandfield Macdonald. After Macdonald's defeat in 1871, he became leader of the Conservative Party and served as Leader of the Opposition until his retirement from politics in 1878. After the legislature, he served as Chief Justice of the Court of Common Pleas until his death in 1887. In 1887 he was made a Knight Bachelor.

Background
He was born in Dundas in Upper Canada, during his studies at Upper Canada College, he lost one leg after a shooting accident. Cameron later articled in law, was called to the bar in 1849 and entered practice with William Henry Boulton in Toronto, Ontario. He was created a QC on 27 March 1863, and elected a bencher of the Law Society of Upper Canada in April 1871. In 1887, he was created a Knight Bachelor shortly before his death.

Politics
In 1861, he was elected to the Legislative Assembly of the Province of Canada for North Ontario; he was defeated in 1863 but was elected in an 1864 by-election when the incumbent, William McDougall, was forced to run for re-election after he was named to the executive council. Cameron was opposed to Confederation, preferring a legislative union. In 1867, he ran unsuccessfully in Ontario North in the federal election but was elected for Toronto East to the provincial legislature.

Cameron entered the Cabinet of Premier John Sandfield Macdonald in 1867 as Provincial Secretary and Registrar of Ontario.

In 1871, he became Commissioner of Crown Lands. With the defeat of the Macdonald government in the provincial election that December, Cameron became leader of the Ontario Conservative Party, but stepped down in 1878 to accept the appointment of Chief Justice of the Court of Common Pleas.

External links 
 
 

1822 births
1887 deaths
Canadian Knights Bachelor
Canadian people of English descent
Canadian people of Scottish descent
Canadian King's Counsel
Judges in Ontario
Lawyers in Ontario
Leaders of the Progressive Conservative Party of Ontario
Members of the Legislative Assembly of the Province of Canada from Canada West
People from Dundas, Ontario
Progressive Conservative Party of Ontario MPPs
Provincial Secretaries of Ontario
Upper Canada College alumni